|}

The Eyrefield Stakes is a Group 3 flat horse race in Ireland open to two-year-old thoroughbreds. It is run at Leopardstown over a distance of 1 mile and 1 furlong (1,811 metres), and it is scheduled to take place each year in October or November.

The event was formerly titled the Old Connell Race, and it used to be held at the Curragh. It became known as the Eyrefield Race in 1990. It was transferred to Leopardstown in 1995, and from this point it was called the Eyrefield Stakes. It was upgraded from Listed to Group 3 status in 2017.

Records
Leading jockey since 1988 (6 wins):
 Michael Kinane – Beyond the Lake (1988), Sinissipi (1992), On the Nile (2001), Yesterday (2002), Mikado (2003), Mourayan (2008)

Leading trainer since 1988 (11 wins):
 Aidan O'Brien – Strawberry Roan (1996), Chiang Mai (1999), On the Nile (2001), Yesterday (2002), Mikado (2003), Yehudi (2004), Anton Chekhov (2006), Alessandro Volta (2007), Mikhail Glinka (2009), Mekong River (2013), Flag Of Honour (2017)

Winners since 1988

See also
 Horse racing in Ireland
 List of Irish flat horse races

References

 Racing Post:

 pedigreequery.com – Old Connell.
 pedigreequery.com – Eyrefield Race.
 ifhaonline.org – International Federation of Horseracing Authorities – Eyrefield Stakes (2019).

Flat races in Ireland
Flat horse races for two-year-olds
Leopardstown Racecourse